Procambarus erythrops, the Santa Fe cave crayfish, is a species of crayfish in the family Cambaridae. It is only known from five sites, all of which are north of the Santa Fe River, east of the Suwannee River, and west of Ichetucknee Springs, in Suwannee County, Florida.

References

Cambaridae
Endemic fauna of Florida
Freshwater crustaceans of North America
Cave crayfish
Taxonomy articles created by Polbot
Crustaceans described in 1975